The thirteenth season of ABC reality television series The Bachelor premiered on January 5, 2009, and featured 32-year-old single parent Jason Mesnick from Kirkland, Washington. Mesnick was the runner-up of season four of The Bachelorette featuring DeAnna Pappas. He became the second former The Bachelorette suitor to compete on The Bachelor since Bob Guiney of season 1 of The Bachelorette and season 4 of The Bachelor.

The season concluded on March 2, 2009, with Mesnick choosing to propose to 25-year-old sales rep Melissa Rycroft. However, during the After The Final Rose special Mesnick broke up with Rycroft after realizing he was still in love with runner-up Molly Malaney. Mesnick and Malaney married in February 2010 and currently live in Washington with Mesnick's son and their daughter. Rycroft went on to marry Tye Strickland and have three children together.

This was the first season Neil Lane Couture sponsoring the jewelry line for this season, replacing Tacori.

Contestants

Biographical information according to ABC official series site, plus footnoted additions

Future appearances

The Bachelorette
Jillian Harris was chosen as the lead of the fifth season of The Bachelorette.

Bachelor Pad
Natalie Getz and Nikki Kaapke returned for the first season of Bachelor Pad. Kaapke was eliminated during week 5, while Getz won the season alongside Bachelor Nation alumnus, David Good.

Dancing with the Stars
Melissa Rycroft competed in the eighth season of Dancing with the Stars, replacing an injured Nancy O'Dell and partnering with Tony Dovolani. She finished in 3rd place. Rycroft would compete again in the all-star season of Dancing with the Stars and was partnered with Dovolani again. They were later announced as winners.

Other appearances
Outside of the Bachelor Nation franchise, Getz appeared as a contestant in the Bachelors vs. Bachelorettes special on the season 7 of Wipeout.

Call-out order

 The contestant received the first impression rose.
 The contestant was originally voted off by the other women, but received a rose instead.
 The contestant received a rose during the date.
 The contestant was eliminated.
 The contestant was eliminated during the date.
 The contestant quit the competition.
 The contestant won the competition.

Episodes

After the Final Rose
During the "After the Final Rose" special, which was taped six weeks after filming ended, and aired immediately after the season finale, Jason Mesnick told Chris Harrison that he felt the chemistry with Melissa changed and that he would break up with her and then ask Molly to give him another chance. Jason explained to Melissa how he was feeling. After some arguing, she then gave him his ring back, asked him to leave her alone, and left. During Chris' interview with Molly, she admitted she still loved Jason. Jason told Molly that he broke up with Melissa and that he hadn't been able to stop thinking about her. He asked her if they could have another shot and he admitted that he still loved her. She agreed to "see where things go."

On the other hand, host Chris Harrison announced that Jillian became the next bachelorette for the fifth season of The Bachelorette and has insisted that the outcome was not manipulated by show producers to increase ratings.

Ratings

U.S. Nielsen Ratings

Episode 8 is The Women Tell All Special.
Episode 10, the After the Final Rose Special had the highest rated number ever in this special episode in The Bachelor history.
Episode 11, the 2nd part of the After the Final Rose Special

Notes

Post-show
In the season finale, it was revealed that Jason had called off the engagement with Melissa and resumed a relationship with runner-up Molly.

Jason married Molly on February 27, 2010. In addition to his son with his ex-wife, Tyler (born January 25, 2005), Jason and Molly have one daughter together, Riley Anne (born March 14, 2013).

Melissa married Tye Strickland on December 12, 2009. Melissa and Tye have three children together, Ava Grace (born February 16, 2011), Beckett Thomas (born April 20, 2014), and Cayson Jack (born May 18, 2016).

References

External links

13
2009 American television seasons
Television shows filmed in California
Television shows shot in the Las Vegas Valley
Television shows filmed in Washington (state)
Television shows filmed in British Columbia
Television shows filmed in Michigan
Television shows filmed in Texas
Television shows filmed in New Zealand